Battle of Tarakan may refer to two actions in the Pacific campaign of World War II, on the island of Tarakan, off the north-east coast of Borneo:

 Battle of Tarakan (1942), January 11–12, 1942, the Japanese assault on the island, defeating Allied forces there.
 Battle of Tarakan (1945), May 1–25, 1945, the first phase of the Allied campaign to re-take Borneo.

Tarakan
North Kalimantan